Poznań is an important academic center in Poland. It operates here 8 public (state) schools – including 5 universities – and 20 private universities (non-state) (2012). In Poznań there are studying, according to data from 2012, more than 135,000 students.

Public universities 

 Adam Mickiewicz University in Poznań
 Poznań University of Technology
Poznań University of Medical Sciences
 University of Life Sciences in Poznań
 Poznań University of Economics
 University of Fine Arts in Poznań
 Academy of Music named Ignacy Jan Paderewski in Poznań
 Academy of Physical Education named Eugene Piasecki in Poznań

Private universities 
 Archiepiscopal Seminary of Poznań
 Poznań School of Business
 Greater College of Tourism and Management in Poznań
 School of Banking in Poznań
 School Safety in Poznań
 College of Education and Therapy in Poznań
 School Integration and Intercultural Education in Poznań
 College of Commerce and Accountancy
 Higher School of Commerce and Services in Poznań
 College of Hotel and Catering
 College of Foreign Languages named Samuel Bogumil Linde
 School of Communication and Management in Poznań
 School of Logistics
 The School of Humanities and Journalism
 College of Education and Administration named in Poznań
 School of Social Sciences
 School of Management and Banking in Poznań
 Higher Vocational School "Human Resources for Europe" in Poznań
 University of Applied Sciences Health Care and Beauty
 Seminary of the Society of Christ

Departments fledging private universities 

 Collegium Humanum – Warsaw Management University
 SWPS University of Social Sciences and Humanities
 SWPS School of Form

Historical universities 
 Lubrański Academy
 Jesuit College in Poznań
 Higher School Officers Armour
 College of Quartermaster Service Officers
 School Officers named Stefan Czarniecki
 School Posnaniensis - College of Applied Arts

See also 
 Poznań

References 

Poznan
Education in Poznań